The Industrial & Systems Engineering Program offers a Bachelor of Science degree in industrial engineering at the King Fahd University of Petroleum & Minerals (KFUPM) in the Kingdom of Saudi Arabia. With a total of 133 credit hours, the program covers the major areas of industrial engineering, such as operations research, production planning, inventory control, methods engineering, quality control, facility location, manufacturing, and facility layout.

History
The Industrial & Systems Engineering (ISE) program in the Systems Engineering Department was first introduced in 1984 and has been revised in 1996 based on the Accreditation Board for Engineering and Technology (ABET) recommendation after their first visit in 1993. The revision made in 1996 came after when the number of credit hours of the Bachelor of Science (B.Sc) was reduced from 141 to 133 credit hours. The program has received ABET accreditation extension in 2010.

Program Courses
The ISE program has a total of 50 credit hours on required ISE courses, with the following descriptions:
 Introduction to I&SE
 Probability & Statistics
 Regression for Industrial Engineering
 Linear Control Systems
 Numerical Methods
 Operations Research I
 Statistical Quality Control
 Principles of Industrial Costing
 Engineering Economics
 Manufacturing Technology
 Work and Process Improvement
 Fundamental of Database Systems
 Seminar
 Industrial Engineering Design
 Production Systems
 Stochastic Systems Simulation
 Operations Research II
 Facility Layout and Location
 Senior Design

External links
Codes of courses and description
Department website

Industrial engineering